Abdul Salam Azimi (born 1936 in Farah Province) is an Afghan judge who was the Chief Justice of Afghanistan and, as such, the head of the Afghan Supreme Court from May 2006 to October 2014, when he resigned his position.

A former professor at the University of Nebraska at Omaha in the United States, Azimi served as legal advisor to Afghan President Hamid Karzai and assisted with writing the 2004 Constitution of Afghanistan. He is an ethnic Pashtun of the Alizai tribe. Prior to the Soviet Invasion of 1979, Azimi and his family resided in the Kabul province of Afghanistan and were forced to flee the country in 1981 after the fall of the Communist regime and resulting civil war. Azimi has three daughters and three sons, one being Abdul Ghafar Azimi who studied in Omaha, Nebraska and graduated from the University of Nebraska at Omaha, and another is Hanan Azimi, who also studied at the University of Nebraska at Omaha, and is a well-respected teacher in the Omaha area.
As chief justice, Azimi replaced Faisal Ahmad Shinwari, a conservative Islamic cleric with no higher education. Azimi, in contrast, is reported to have gained a reputation as a fair-minded moderate active in upholding the rule of law and improving the country's dilapidated legal system.

See also
Politics of Afghanistan

References

External links
 Biography of Abdul Salam Azimi

University of Arizona faculty
1936 births
People from Farah Province
Afghan Sunni Muslims
Living people
Pashtun people
Supreme Court Justices of Afghanistan